"I Can't Quit" is a song by the CEDM group Capital Kings featuring Christian rapper Reconcile. It was released in the iTunes Store on July 29, 2016. It is the first song by the group featuring Dylan Housewright as the singer instead of Jon White.

Composition 
The song features pumping house beats and is 128 BPM. Both Cole and Reconcile rap in their respective verses. While Dylan Housewright does some singing, his verse is short.

Music video 
The music video was released on YouTube on July 27, 2016. It was directed by the Edwards Brothers for EVOLVE. EVOLVE released the music video later on Vimeo, on December 2, 2016.

Track listing 
Digital download
 "I Can't Quit (featuring Reconcile)" – 3:27

Charts

Release history

References 

2016 songs
2016 singles
Capital Kings songs